ImagineFX is a digital art magazine that features workshops and interviews with artists from the science fiction, fantasy, manga, anime, game and comic disciplines.

History and profile
Published in Bath, UK by Future plc since January 2006, the main focus of ImagineFX is the workshops featured in the second half of the magazine, which is published on a monthly basis. Artists such as Ryan Church, Jonny Duddle, Martin Bland and Henning Ludvigsen contribute to the magazine. The magazine come with a DVD but has since switched to digital downloads that include the workshop files that relate to the tutorials in the magazine, program demos, free fonts, textures, images and Photoshop brushes. It also has small segments of traditional and 3D art.

Each month the magazine features an interview with artists such as Alan Lee, Larry Elmore, Frank Frazetta and Jim Burns. Features such as "Rising Star", "Artist Porfolios" and reader galleries showcase the work of up-and-coming artists.

References

External links

2006 establishments in the United Kingdom
Visual arts magazines published in the United Kingdom
Monthly magazines published in the United Kingdom
Digital art
Magazines established in 2006
Mass media in Bath, Somerset